Events from the year 1900 in France.

Incumbents
President: Émile Loubet
President of the Council of Ministers: Pierre Waldeck-Rousseau

Events
 31 March – The length of a workday for women and children is limited to 11 hours by law.
 1 April – Every French policeman is assigned to carry a gun.
 14 April – Paris World Exhibition opens.
 21 April – Battle of Kousséri takes place in Chad, linking all French possessions in Western Africa.
 27 June – Treaty of Paris is signed between the Spanish Empire and the French Empire by which Río Muni is relieved of all conflicting claims.
 19 July – The first line of the Métro is inaugurated in Paris.
 First Michelin Guide published.

Arts and literature
 2 February – First performance of Gustave Charpentier's opera, Louise.
 21 November – Claude Monet's paintings shown at Gallery Durand-Ruel in Paris

Sport
 14 May–28 October - Olympic Games held in Paris.

Births

January to March
 3 January – Marcel Gobillot, cyclist and Olympic medallist (died 1981)
 5 January – Yves Tanguy, surrealist painter (died 1955)
 9 January – Emmanuel d'Astier de la Vigerie, journalist, politician and French Resistance member (died 1969)
 11 January – Benoît Fauré, cyclist (died 1980)
 24 January – René Guillot, author (died 1969)
 4 February – Jacques Prévert, poet and screenwriter (died 1977)
 11 February – Raymond Cambefort, one of the last three fully verified World War I veterans living in France (died 2008)
 21 February – Madeleine Renaud, actress (died 1994)
 6 March – Henri Jeanson, writer and journalist (died 1970)
 8 March – Pierre David-Weill, investment banker (died 1975)
 19 March – Frédéric Joliot-Curie, physicist and Nobel laureate (died 1958)

April to June
 13 April – Pierre Molinier, painter and photographer (died 1976)
 15 April – Pierre Nord, writer, spy and resistance member (died 1985)
 20 April – Jacques Adnet, designer, architect and interior designer (died 1984)
 27 April – Marcel Légaut, philosopher and mathematician (died 1990)
 28 April
 Maurice Thorez, communist politician (died 1964)
 Jean Vaysse, rugby union player (died 1974)
 17 May – Achille Souchard, cyclist (died 1976)
 22 May – Yvonne de Gaulle, married to Charles de Gaulle (died 1979)
 14 June – Roger Bourdin, baritone (died 1973)
 29 June – Antoine de Saint-Exupéry, pilot and writer (died 1944)

July to December
 4 July – Robert Desnos, surrealist poet (died 1945)
 12 July – Marcel Paul, trade unionist and communist politician (died 1982)
 17 July – Marcel Dalio, actor (died 1983)
 19 July – Pierre Coquelin de Lisle, sport shooter and Olympic gold medallist (died 1980)
 26 July – Jacques Février, pianist (died 1979)
 11 August – Georges Limbour, writer (died 1970)
 6 September – Marc Bernard, writer (died 1983).
 30 September – Pierre Yvert, philatelic editor (died 1964)
 9 October – Henri Lauvaux, athlete and Olympic medallist (died 1970)
 13 October – Ghislaine Marie Françoise Dommanget, actress and Princess of Monaco (died 1991)
 November – Émile Gagnan, engineer and inventor (died 1979)
 15 December – Hellé Nice, model, dancer and motor racing driver (died 1984)

Full date unknown
 Suzanne Dechevaux-Dumesnil, lover and later married to Samuel Beckett (died 1989)
 Georges Neveux, dramatist and poet (died 1982)

Deaths
 11 February – Émile Blanchard, zoologist and entomologist (born 1819)
 19 March – Charles-Louis Hanon, piano pedagogue and composer (born 1819)
 26 March – Victor Auguste, baron Duperré, colonial administrator (born 1825)
 5 April – Joseph Louis François Bertrand, mathematician (born 1822)
 15 April - Gaston Louis Alfred Leroux, writer (born 1868)
 22 April – Amédée-François Lamy, military officer (born 1858)
 18 May – Félix Ravaisson-Mollien, philosopher and archaeologist (born 1813)
 16 June – François d'Orléans, prince de Joinville, admiral (born 1818)
 24 September – Louis Ratisbonne, writer and man of letters (born 1827)
 13 October – Louis Adolphe Cochery, politician and journalist (born 1819)
 Full date unknown – Jules Adenis, dramatist and opera librettist (born 1823)

See also
 List of French films before 1910

References

1900s in France